Nikolskoye is a rural locality (a selo) and the administrative center of Tolshmenskoye Rural Settlement, Totemsky District, Vologda Oblast, Russia. The population was 511 as of 2002. There are 10 streets.

Geography 
Nikolskoye is located 75 km south of Totma (the district's administrative centre) by road. Puzovka is the nearest rural locality.

References 

Rural localities in Totemsky District